Phú Lâm may refer to several places in Vietnam, including:

Phú Lâm, Phú Yên, a ward of Tuy Hòa
Phú Lâm, An Giang, a commune of Phú Tân District, An Giang
Phú Lâm, Bắc Ninh, a commune of Tiên Du District
Phú Lâm, Đồng Nai, a commune of Tân Phú District, Đồng Nai
Phú Lâm, Thanh Hóa, a commune of Tĩnh Gia District
Phú Lâm, Tuyên Quang, a commune of Yên Sơn District

See also
Woody Island (South China Sea)